Tuomas Nieminen (born 16 September 1981) is a Finnish long track speed skater who participates in international competitions.

Personal records

References

External links
Tuomas Nieminen Website
Tuomas Nieminen at speedskatingphotos-by-biseth

1981 births
Finnish male speed skaters
Living people
Speed skaters at the 2010 Winter Olympics
Olympic speed skaters of Finland